The Boston Blazers are a lacrosse team based in Boston playing in the National Lacrosse League (NLL). The 2010 season was their second season in the NLL.

Standings

Game log
Reference:

Playoffs

Game log
Reference:

Transactions

Trades

Entry draft
The 2009 NLL Entry Draft took place on September 9, 2009. The Blazers selected the following players:

Roster

See also
2010 NLL season

References

Boston
2010 in sports in Massachusetts